Beograd, uživo '97 – 2 (trans. Belgrade, Live '97 – 2) is the second disc of the fourth live album by Serbian and former Yugoslav rock band Riblja Čorba, released in 1997. Beograd, uživo '97 - 2 was preceded by Beograd, uživo '97 - 1, as the band, instead of releasing a double live album, opted for two separate releases. Album was recorded on Riblja Čorba concert held on June 1, 1997 on Belgrade's Tašmajdan Stadium.

Track listing
"Dva dinara druže"- 6:50
"Vetar duva, duva, duva" - 1:48
"Dobro jutro" - 5:38
"Južna Afrika '85 (Ja ću da pevam)" - 4:46
"Amsterdam - 5:10
"Avionu slomiću ti krila" - 4:14
"Zelena trava doma mog" - 3:50
"Kada padne noć (Upomoć)" - 7:54
"Pogledaj dom svoj, anđele" - 6:35
"Kad sam bio mlad" - 2:58
"Lutka sa naslovne strane" - 2:46
"Ostani đubre do kraja" - 5:51

Personnel
Bora Đorđević - vocals, acoustic guitar
Vidoja Božinović - guitar
Miša Aleksić - bass guitar
Vicko Milatović - drums
Vlada Barjaktarević - keyboards

References 

Beograd, uživo '97 – 2 at Discogs
 EX YU ROCK enciklopedija 1960-2006,  Janjatović Petar;  
 Riblja čorba,  Jakovljević Mirko;

External links 
Beograd, uživo '97 – 2 at Discogs

Riblja Čorba live albums
1997 live albums
Hi-Fi Centar live albums